Henry Hutton Parry (18 December 1826 – 15 November 1893) was a bishop of the Church of England. He was consecrated co-adjutor bishop in Barbados in 1868. He was translated to Perth to become the second Bishop of the Anglican Diocese of Perth, a position held from 1876 to 1893.

Early life
He was born in Antigua, the second son of Thomas Parry and Louisa Hutton. Educated at Rugby School, he entered Balliol College, Oxford, (B.A., 1851; M.A., 1859), and the University of Durham (D.D., 1876).

Parry is noted as the driving force for the construction of St George's Cathedral, Perth, which was consecrated on 15 November 1888 by the Bishop of Sydney, Alfred Barry.  He died in Perth, Western Australia.

Family
Parry was married to Mary Susannah Leake, eldest daughter of George Walpole Leake.

References

Further reading

External links

1826 births
1893 deaths
Anglican bishops of Perth
Burials at East Perth Cemeteries
Alumni of Balliol College, Oxford